Raimondas Vilčinskas (born 5 July 1977 in Panevėžys) is a retired Lithuanian professional road and track cyclist.

Vilcinskas made his official debut as an amateur rider at the 1996 Summer Olympics in Atlanta, where he competed along with his fellow cyclists Linas Balčiūnas, Raimondas Rumšas, Remigijus Lupeikis, and Ivanas Romanovas in the men's road race, but did not finish the course. During his amateur career, Vilcinskas had awarded a silver medal in the same discipline at the 1997 Lithuanian championships, but turned himself into pro in 1999 with Belgium's Palmans-Legal cycling team, and thereby picked up his first career title at the Memorial Philippe Van Coningsloo.

When Palmans-Legal folded after the 2000 season, Vilcinskas signed a two-year contract with Poland's . In 2002, he became a Lithuanian champion in the time trial at the elite tournament in Vilnius, before leaving his pro cycling team to turn his sights on the men's track team pursuit by the following year. In early 2004, Vilcinskas posted a fastest time of 4.05.305 to share his gold medals with Linas Balčiūnas, Aivaras Baranauskas, and Tomas Vaitkus during the final match against Ukraine in the men's team pursuit at the opening leg of the UCI World Cup Series in Moscow, Russia.

Eight years after competing in his last Olympics, Vilcinskas qualified for his second Lithuanian squad, as a 27-year-old, in the men's team pursuit at the 2004 Summer Olympics in Athens based on the nation's selection process from the UCI Track World Rankings. He delivered the Lithuanian foursome of Balčiūnas, Baranauskas, and Ignatas Konovalovas an eighth-place time of 4:08.812 in the prelims before his team was later relegated and overlapped to an aggressive Aussie squad of Graeme Brown, Brett Lancaster, Brad McGee, and Luke Roberts in the fourth match round.

Career highlights

1997
 2nd Lithuanian Championships (Road), Lithuania
1999
 1st Antwerpse Havenpijl, Belgium
 1st Memorial Philippe Van Coningsloo, Belgium
2001
 3rd Stage 1, Tour of Poland, Sopot (POL)
2002
 1st  Lithuanian Championships (ITT), Lithuania
 2nd Prologue, Tour de Normandie, Mondeville (FRA)
 3rd Stage 4, Tour of Poland, Zielona Góra (POL)
2003
 2nd Lithuanian Championships (ITT), Lithuania
2004
  UCI World Cup (Team pursuit), Moscow (RUS)
 2nd Lithuanian Championships (Road), Lithuania
 8th Olympic Games (Team pursuit), Athens (GRE)
2005
 2nd Stage 3, Tour de l'Eurometropole, Quiévrain (FRA)

References

External links

1977 births
Living people
Lithuanian male cyclists
Lithuanian track cyclists
Cyclists at the 1996 Summer Olympics
Cyclists at the 2004 Summer Olympics
Olympic cyclists of Lithuania
Sportspeople from Panevėžys